The 1995–96 Sheffield Shield season was the 94th season of the Sheffield Shield, the domestic first-class cricket competition of Australia. South Australia won the championship.

Table

Final

References

Sheffield Shield
Sheffield Shield
Sheffield Shield seasons